The Oaks is a small settlement on the northern banks of the Olifants River in the Limpopo province of South Africa. It resorts under the Maruleng Local Municipality in Mopani District Municipality.

References

Populated places in the Maruleng Local Municipality